The following lists events that happened during 1985 in Cape Verde.

Incumbents
President: Aristides Pereira
Prime Minister: Pedro Pires

Events
December 7: 1985 parliamentary elections took place

Sports
Sporting Praia won the Cape Verdean Football Championship

Births
May 2: João Gomes, basketball player
June 2: Graciano Brito, soccer player (footballer)
July 27: Elvis Macedo Babanco, footballer
August 31: Rolando, footballer
October 11: Joel Almeida, basketball player
October 13: Vanny Reis, pageant

References

 
Years of the 20th century in Cape Verde
1980s in Cape Verde
Cape Verde
Cape Verde